Charles "Chuck" Harrison (September 23, 1931 — November 29, 2018) was an American industrial designer, speaker and educator. He was known for his pioneering role as one of the first African-American industrial designers of the era and the first to lead a design department at a major corporation. He was the first African-American executive to work at Sears, Roebuck and Company, starting in 1961 as a designer and eventually becoming manager of the company's entire design group. He was involved in the design of over 750 consumer products, including the portable hair dryer, toasters, stereos, lawn mowers, sewing machines, Craftsman power tools, the see-through measuring cup, fondue pots, stoves, and the first plastic trash can, which has been credited with changing the sound of trash collection day. Perhaps his most famous achievement was leading the team that updated the View-Master in 1958, designing the classic Model F View-Master.  A Stone Age version of the virtual reality viewer, it allowed users to look at photographs in three dimensions. Two inventors introduced the first version, a bulky model, at the World's Fair in 1939, and it became a specialty item used mainly by photographers. This iconic product sold with only minor colour changes for over 40 years and could be found in almost every US household and households throughout the world. Charles mentioned that one of his inspirations was Charles Eames for his chairs and furniture design. Elliot Noyes for his product designs, primarily typewriters for IBM.

Early life 
Charles Alfred Harrison Jr. was born in Shreveport, La., on Sept. 23, 1931. At the time Harrison was born, his father, Charles Harrison Sr., was teaching industrial arts at Southern University in Louisiana. In 1936, the family moved to Texas where Harrison Sr. become a professor at Prairie View A&M University, a historically black university in Prairie View, Tex. His mother, Cora Lee (Smith) Harrison, had gone back to her parents’ house in Shreveport for the birth, since many hospitals at the time did not welcome blacks. Both Harrison Sr. and Harrison's maternal grandfather were carpenters, and Harrison credits his interest and ability in design to their influence.

In 1945, the family moved to Phoenix, Arizona where the elder Mr. Harrison taught shop at the Phoenix Union Colored High School, from which Charles graduated in 1948. He briefly attended the City College of San Francisco, where he was told his future lay in art, and he headed for the prestigious School of the Art Institute of Chicago. Harrison attended George Washington Carver High School, an all-black high school. The school closed when integration became law in the 1950s, and is now a museum and cultural center celebrating the contributions of African-Americans; a room in the museum is dedicated to Harrison's work.

Harrison was active in extracurricular activities at the high school, playing basketball and tennis, and participating in the band and chorus.

Education 
Harrison attended the School of the Art Institute of Chicago (SAIC) from 1949 to 1954, earning a Bachelor of Fine Arts. One of his undergraduate professors was Henry P. Glass, a high-profile industrial designer who Harrison was really energized to be associated with. Glass recognized Harrison and rewarded him with good grades and the opportunity to visit his studios. They were very accommodating and passionate. Glass would prove to be one of Harrison's greatest mentors and allies over the course of his career. It was also while attending SAIC that Harrison met his future wife.

In 1956, he returned to the school to pursue graduate studies, transferring later to the Illinois Institute of Technology to complete his Master's in Art Education. He received his Master of Science in Art Education from the Institute of Design in 1963.

Career 
Between his undergraduate and graduate degrees, Harrison was drafted into the United States Army and posted to Germany. He served two years in the topography unit doing spot mapping and drafting.

Getting through the segregated system in the United States and finding employment was hard for Harrison. Once he made my way through that he was able to proceed to develop a lifetime career. He said that other challenges were trying to live and pursue a professional career as a black person.

Back in the U.S., fresh out of school, Harrison began looking for work with a design firm. He interviewed at Sears but was told that he could not be hired on staff because he was black. The hiring manager liked Harrison's work, however, and was able to feed him freelance work from Sears on the side. But it was Henry Glass, one of Harrison's undergraduate professors, who gave him his first job with a design firm, putting him to work on furniture designs. Harrison credits Glass with teaching him a great deal about detailing, drawing, and production, as well as the business elements of the trade, such as client relations.

Over the next several years, Harrison worked for Ed Klein & Associates and Robert Podall Associates. It was at Robert Podall Associates in 1958 that Harrison updated the popular View-Master toy. When Mr. Harrison, who was working there, he was put in charge of the View-Master's redesign in 1958, he made it lighter, more durable and much easier to use — easy enough for a child. That simplicity was a hallmark of his work; he was dyslexic, and he wanted to make all his products intuitive so that no one would have to read the instructions. Before getting a call from his old contact at Sears. Sears was ready to offer him a job. It was 1961, and Harrison became the first African-American executive ever hired at the company's Chicago headquarters. Harrison worked for Sears until his retirement in 1993.

His favourite design he created was the plastic garbage can. A very strong form with a minimum of decoration, limited to texture, which is secondary to the form of the product. I enhanced the shape of the product, which allowed it the capability to nest, which gave it an advantage in shipping; it didn't occupy a great volume and could be shipped in a small vehicle. It also didn't require much warehouse space. The lid and the handle were moulded at the same time, which cut down on the tooling and moulding process. These considerations reduced the cost to the end user.

His dream was to connect with a manufacturer or company that could produce a product for public consumption with little consideration for profit margin but to give the customer the best they could have in that design. To develop products for the severely disabled who need low-cost products to be able to live more independently; the need is there.

After retirement, Harrison taught part-time at the University of Illinois at Chicago, School of the Art Institute of Chicago, and at Columbia College Chicago  and made it a point to mentor students of color.

Awards and Exhibitions 

In 2009, Harrison was awarded an honorary doctorate from the School of the Art Institute of Chicago.

In October 2008, he was awarded the Lifetime Achievement National Design Award by Cooper-Hewitt, National Design Museum, Smithsonian Institution. He is the first African-American to receive this accolade.

In 2007, his work was featured alongside other African-American product designers at the Designs for Life: Black Creativity 2007 exhibit at the Museum of Science and Industry (Chicago)

In 2006 he was awarded Focus on DESIGN's Lifetime Achievement Award. In September 2006, he was also awarded the Industrial Designers Society of America's Lifetime Distinguished Service Award. In the same year, his memoir, A Life's Design: The Life and Work of Industrial Designer Charles Harrison, was published by Ibis Design.

In 2000, Harrison's work was featured in an exhibit titled "The World of a Product Designer: Charles Harrison" at the Carver Museum and Cultural Center.

UIC Osmosis Charles Harrison Scholarship- Bridging creative excellence identified in Osmosis minority youth programs with mentorship and financial support for college level design studies  – The UIC School of Design and Project Osmosis.

Death
Harrison died at age 87 on November 29, 2018, the cause was a bacterial infection, said his son, Charles Harrison III.

References

External links
 Design Collection images from University of Illinois at Chicago digital collections - includes dozens of sketches created by Harrison.

Further reading 

 Autobiography by Charles Harrison
 News article on the occasion of Charles Harrison receiving the award for lifetime achievement from FocusOnDesign
 Review of book signing event at the University of Illinois (Chicago) Art & Architecture Building in 2006
 Biographical article on the occasion of Charles Harrison receiving the Cooper-Hewitt, National Design Museum Lifetime Achievement Award

1931 births
2018 deaths
Columbia College Chicago faculty
City College of San Francisco alumni
School of the Art Institute of Chicago alumni
Illinois Institute of Technology alumni
American cartographers
American business executives
African-American business executives
American industrial designers
National Design Award winners
African-American United States Army personnel
20th-century African-American people
21st-century African-American people
People with dyslexia